ECCO Sko A/S is a Danish shoe manufacturer and retailer founded in 1963 by Karl Toosbuy, in Bredebro, Denmark.  The company began with only the production of footwear, but has since expanded into leather production, as well as accessories and small leather goods. ECCO opened its first retail store in Denmark in 1982. ECCO is family-owned and employs 21,300 people worldwide, with product sales in 99 countries from 2,250 shops and 14,000 sales points.

History

ECCO was established in 1963 by Karl Toosbuy in the small town of Bredebro in southern Denmark. Throughout the 1980s, the company expanded its operations internationally. By 1982, sales reached 1 million pairs of shoes annually. In order to accommodate the increasing demand, additional production was established in Portugal, and under license in Japan and Cyprus.
ECCO built its own research and design center, named "Futura", in Denmark in 1996, since 2009 Portugal is the R&D center of ECCO and opened its own beamhouse in Indonesia and tannery in Thailand a few years later. In 1998 the first flagship retail store opened on Oxford Street, in London. By 2000, ECCO owned every step of the production process, from design and leather production to branded retail sales.

Production
ECCO owns tanneries in the Netherlands, Thailand, Indonesia and China. ECCO’s tanneries are among the leading manufacturers of leather to the fashion, sports, and car industries. ECCO has engaged in a research program to reduce the environmental impact of the tanning process.
Approximately 98% of ECCO's shoes are produced in its own shoe factories in Portugal, Slovakia, Thailand, Indonesia, Vietnam and China, and some under licence in India.

In 2016 Adidas filed a trademark suit against ECCO in American courts. However, in 2018, Adidas voluntarily dismissed its claims.

International

ECCO shoes and leather goods are sold in 99 countries. The company has its operations into markets in Asia and in Eastern and Central Europe, Canada, South America, and the United States. Their products are sold through more than 2,250 mono-brand stores, as well as independent retailers and online sales.

Criticism

Quality 
In 1998, ECCO faced problems with a large quantity of shoes. Due to a production fault involving the composition of sole material – hydrolysis of the molded polyurethane – the soles disintegrated after only one to five years. After discovering the source of the problem, ECCO changed the composition of its sole material.

Russia operations 
In March, 2022, ECCO CEO, Panos Mytaros, decided, together with the board of directors and the family owners, to continue its operations in Russia despite the ongoing war in Ukraine, and despite a collective economic war including heavy sanctions directed towards Russia by the European Union and the United States. As a consequence, with effect from April 16th 2023, ECCO will lose its 30 year long status as purveyor to the Danish royal family.

References

External links

 

Shoe brands
Danish brands
Shoe companies of Denmark
Danish companies established in 1963
Multinational companies headquartered in Denmark
Purveyors to the Court of Denmark